Embarrassment is an emotional state experienced upon having an unacceptable act or condition witnessed by or revealed to others.

Embarrassment may also refer to:

 "Embarrassment" (song), a 1980 ska song recorded by Madness
 The Embarrassment, an early punk group
 Embarrassment (Ned's Declassified School Survival Guide episode), an episode of Ned's Declassified School Survival Guide